Kou Yingjie (1880?– 19??) was a military leader in the Republic of China. He belonged to the Zhili clique. In the end, he participated to the Wang Jingwei regime. His courtesy name was Bichen. There are two theories about his birthplace, one was Yanggu, Shandong, the other was Lijin, Shandong.

Biography 
Kou Yingjie worked as a military personnel in Henan Province for a long time, and he belonged to Zhili clique.

In autumn 1924, after the Second Zhili–Fengtian War, Kou Yingjie was appointed to the Commander of the 2nd Mixed Brigade of the Hubei Army. In December, he promoted to the Commander of the 1st Brigade. Next October, he was appointed to the Commander of the 2nd Route Army by Wu Peifu. In 1926, Kou was appointed to the Supreme Commander of the Henan Army. After Wu was defeated by the National Revolutionary Army (NRA), Kou also resigned his post.

Later Kou Yingjie was appointed to the 12th Army of the Zhili-Shandong (Zhi-Lu) United Army which Zhang Zongchang commanded. But Zhang also was defeated by NRA, so Kou surrendered to them. Kou was appointed to the 44th Army of NRA.

After the Wang Jingwei regime was established, Kou Yingjie was appointed to the Councilor (Full General) of the General Staff Office but his achievements in this regime and the whereabouts of Kou were not known.

See also 
List of people who disappeared

References

Books
 
 
 
 

1880s births
1940s missing person cases
Chinese collaborators with Imperial Japan
Missing person cases in China
National Revolutionary Army generals from Shandong
People from Liaocheng
Year of death uncertain